Yan Jinjin (born 10 September 1996) is a Chinese footballer who plays as a midfielder. She has been a member of the China women's national team.

International goals

References

1996 births
Living people
Chinese women's footballers
Women's association football midfielders
China women's international footballers